The Midwest Premier League (MWPL) is an American amateur and semi-professional soccer league. The league spans primarily the eastern and central portions of the Midwestern United States.

History
The league was founded by four clubs which were all previously members of the United Premier Soccer League Midwest Conference. Following the 2019 UPSL season, the clubs decided that they could create a stable league that would focus on sustainability of the member clubs by sharing ideas, keeping league costs to a minimum, and maximizing the opportunities for all clubs to compete by limiting end-of-season playoffs that often shorten the season for many teams.

The league announced Union Dubuque F.C. as its first member on September 18, 2019, with the other three founding members being announced in the subsequent weeks. RWB Adria joins the MPWL on September 25, 2019. DeKalb County United joins the MWPL on October 2, 2019. Cedar Rapids Inferno join the MWPL on October 9, 2019 making it the Fourth member team. And concludes the joining of the founders.

Cliff Conrad has been elected as the league's first president. Conrad is the co-founder and president of Union Dubuque F.C., one of the league's charter members.

After a period with no expansion news, FC Diablos of Normal, Illinois was announced on January 10, 2020, and an expansion continues into March. With expansion side Rockford FC being unveiled shortly thereafter on January 30, 2020. Livonia City FC joins the MWPL on Feb. 29th 2020. Lake St.Clair joins the MWPL on March 2, 2020.  BiH Grand Rapids joins the MWPL on March 6, 2020.

The league was set to kickoff in Spring 2020, however the season was cancelled due to the COVID-19 pandemic in the United States.

The Midwest Premier League appoints Andy Hayes as the league's first Commissioner.

On July 27, 2020, the league announced Lansing Common FC from Lansing, Michigan as a new member club.

On September 3, 2020, the MWPL entered a partnership agreement with the National Independent Soccer Association, a USSF Division 3 professional league, which includes pathways for both players and clubs to go fully pro.

November kicks off another round of expansions for the league. Starting with Edgewater Castle FC on Nov. 27th 2020.

It was announced on March 21, 2022 that the MWPL would have 3 Divisions within it.

The schedule for the 2nd season of the league was announced on April 6, 2022 nearly a month ahead of the first game. With Detroit city U23 gone there will be a new champion in the East Division. And with a finalized Southern Division there will now be 3 champions for the 2022 season.

Current teams

Former

Seasons

2021 Fall Season 
The first season for the MWPL ended on August 1, 2021

East Division 
This division contained 8 teams for the 2021 season. 

Rules for classification: P) points; (GP) games played; (GD) goal differential;

(C) Champion

Western Division 
This division contained 12 teams for the 2021 season. 

Rules for classification: P) points; (GP) games played; (GD) goal differential;

(C) Champion

2022 season 
The first season with 3 divisions in it.

Eastern Division 
This division contained 11 teams for the 2022 season. 

Rules for classification: P) points; (GP) games played; (GD) goal differential;

(C) Champion

Western Division 
This division contained 12 teams for the 2022 season. 

Rules for classification: P) points; (GP) games played; (GD) goal differential;

(C) Champion

Southern Division 
This division contained 4 teams for the 2022 season. 

Rules for classification: P) points; (GP) games played; (GD) goal differential;

(C) Champion

Division Winners 
East Division Winner

West Division Winner

South Division Winner

Golden Boot winner 
The golden boot winners were announced on September 15, 2021.

Notable former players 
 Damon Almazan, Steel City FC - 2020, signed in 2021 by Chicago House AC
 Derek Huffman, RWB Adria - 2020, signed in 2021 by Chicago House AC
 Stefan Mijatovic, RWB Adria - 2020, signed in 2021 by Chicago House AC

References

Soccer leagues in the United States
2019 establishments in the United States
Sports leagues established in 2019
Soccer in Iowa
Soccer in Wisconsin
Soccer in Illinois
Soccer in Michigan